Hi-risers, are a type of heavily-customized automobile, typically a full-size, body-on-frame, rear-wheel drive American sedan modified by significantly increasing the vehicle's ground clearance and adding large-diameter wheels with low-profile tires. Depending on the model and style of body, autos customized in this manner can be labeled "box" or "bubble".

Overview

Hi-risers originally grew out of the Dirty South subculture, but the trend has spread across the United States. Vehicles customized in the hi-riser style are distinguished by their over-sized (even disproportionate) wheels, ranging from 20 inches to 30 inches or more in diameter (largest being 50 inch), as well as fanciful custom paint-jobs and expensive audio equipment. Suspension modifications similar to those employed on lifted pickup trucks are made to give adequate clearance for the large wheels. Often the suspension is modified so the front end sits slightly higher than the rear end, giving the car a swaggering appearance. Because of the exaggerated look gained from installing a lifted suspension and enormous wheels, donks are also known as "hi-risers" or "skyscrapers".

Most hi-riser enthusiasts agree that a "donk" traditionally is a 1971-1976 Chevrolet Impala or Caprice. They were given this name because the "Impala" logo was referred to as a "donkey" by owners, or "donk" for short. To complement the sloping rear, the suspension of donks are frequently higher in the front end than the rear, resulting in a nose-up stance. Other hi-risers are usually raised evenly, resulting in a more or less level stance. A "box" is a sub-type of hi-riser, usually a malaise era Impala or Caprice with a boxy or squared-off front and rear end. Other malaise era models that are frequently made into hi-risers include the G-body Buick Regal, Oldsmobile Cutlass, Chevrolet El Camino, Pontiac Grand Prix, and Pontiac Bonneville.

The most popular vehicles for these types of modifications are late 20th century, full-size, rear wheel drive sedans and coupes manufactured by General Motors, namely the Chevrolet Impala, Chevrolet Caprice, Buick Roadmaster, Oldsmobile 98, Cadillac DeVille, Cadillac Seville, Cadillac Fleetwood, Cadillac Fleetwood Brougham, and Cadillac Brougham, as well as mid-size cars such as the Chevrolet Monte Carlo, Buick Century, and Oldsmobile Cutlass Supreme. Full-size Ford models such as the Ford Crown Victoria, Lincoln Town Car, and Mercury Grand Marquis are also popular, largely due to the ability to buy used Ford Crown Victoria Police Interceptors for low prices.

Music style and slang
Hi-risers are an integral part of the music scenes in Indianapolis, St. Louis, the East Coast, the Central U.S., and Miami. Donk riders and rappers from this area in particular also share unique styles of slang and clothing. In South Florida, drivers of cars that would otherwise be considered classic and have had their stock tires replaced with 24s, are referred to as donk riders. The expression is thought to have originated with rapper Trick Daddy, who hails from the Miami neighborhood of Liberty City. One prominent donk rider style in the South Florida area pairs dreadheads with gold teeth, and has spread throughout Florida over the years.

Technical challenges
Raising a vehicle off of the ground by such a degree raises the center of mass to a point where rolling the vehicle becomes a distinct possibility. The suspension modifications required are often meant for trucks and larger vehicles. If the vehicle's brakes have not been upgraded to compensate for the significant increase in wheel diameter, its braking ability will be greatly diminished. If the vehicle turns too fast, the weight of the vehicle may shift to extremes that were never considered for the vehicle in question, which may result loss of traction or damage to the vehicle. If not done the right way by a skilled technician, a wheel could come off while driving, resulting in significant damage to anything it hits. If done properly, it should handle in a similar fashion to a lifted truck or SUV.

See also
 Scraper (car)
 Dub (wheel)
 Lowriders
 Southern rap

References

Modified vehicles
Automotive styling features
Subcultures